Mithileshwar, born on December 31, 1950, in Baisadeeh village of Bhojpur district in Bihar, India, is a Hindi writer noted for writing on the rural heartland of India. He wrote beautifully about the rural parts of India, highlighting the struggles and problems faced by rural people of India. He started writing during his student period and has accumulated many awards in his career. His stories are mostly based on the state of the common man in our society. He describes the mental state of poor, exploited people from villages or the ones going through diverse conditions in a rapidly industrializing modern day India. He minutely observes people and writes with deep insight on their status in life and society.

Career 
 M.A, Ph.D. (Hindi)
 Reader, Hindi Department, H.D. Jain College Ara, Bihar

Literary work

Stories 
 Babuji (1976)
 Band Raston ke Beech (1978)
 Doosra Mahabharat (1979)
 Meghna Ka Nirnay
 Bhor Hone se Pahale
 Tiriya Janam (1982)
 Harihar Kaka (1983)
 Ek Mein Anek (1987)
 Ek the Professor B. Lal (1993)
 Kamal

Novels 
 Prem na Badi Oopjai
 Surang me Subah
 Yah Ant Nahin
 Jhunia (1980)
 Yuddh Sthal (1981)

Children's stories 
 Us Rat Ki Bat (1993)

Collections 
 Charchit Kahaniyan
 Chal Khusro Ghar Aapne
 Das Pratinidhi Kahaniyan

Awards 
 Akhil Bhartiya MuktiBodh Puraskar by M.P. Sahitya Parishad (1976)
 Soviet Land Nehru Puraskar for Band Raston Ke Beech (1979)
 Yashpal Puraskar by U.P. Hindi Sansthan (1981–82)
 Amrit Puraskar by Nikhil Bharat Bang Sahitya Sammelan
 The 4th Shrilal Shukla Sahitya IFFCO Samman (2015)

References

External links 
 See further details of his books at Pustak.org
 Tales of Showman, a play based on Babuji by Mithileshwar

Hindi-language writers
Writers from Bihar
Living people
20th-century Indian short story writers
20th-century Indian novelists
People from Bhojpur district, India
Year of birth missing (living people)

es:Categoría:Escritores en hindi
fr:Catégorie:Écrivain indien d'expression hindi